Jónatan Ingi Jónsson (born 15 March 1999) is an Icelandic footballer who plays as a winger for Norwegian club Sogndal and the Iceland national team.

Career
Jónatan started his senior career with his local club FH in 2018 after having spent three years in the youth teams of AZ in the Netherlands. Jónatan transferred from FH to Sogndal before the 2022 season.

International career
Jónatan Ingi made his international debut for Iceland on 6 November 2022 in a friendly match against Saudi Arabia.

References

External links
 
 

1999 births
Living people
Association football wingers
Jonatan Ingi Jonsson
Jonatan Ingi Jonsson
Jonatan Ingi Jonsson
Jonatan Ingi Jonsson
Jonatan Ingi Jonsson
Sogndal Fotball players
Jonatan Ingi Jonsson
Norwegian First Division players
Jonatan Ingi Jonsson
Jonatan Ingi Jonsson
Expatriate footballers in the Netherlands
Jonatan Ingi Jonsson
Expatriate footballers in Norway